CNCP may refer to:

 China National Petroleum Corporation, Chinese petroleum company
 CNCP Telecommunications, Canadian telecom company
 Commission nationale de la certification professionnelle, French National Commission for Vocational Certification